Major General Sir Eustace Francis Tickell KBE CB MC (10 December 1893 – 28 December 1972) was a senior British Army officer during the Second World War.

Military career
Born on 10 December 1893 in Srinagar Kashmir, Eustace Tickell was educated at Bedford School and at the Royal Military Academy, Woolwich. He received his first commission in the Royal Engineers in 1913 and served in France, Greece and Palestine during the First World War.

Tickell served as an instructor at the Royal School of Military Engineering in 1919 and, after marrying two years later, he returned to the RMA Woolwich, this time as an instructor, from 1924−1927. He then served in Northern China in 1928, before returning to the United Kingdom to become officer commanding (OC) Royal Engineers officers at Cambridge University from 1932−1934. He was then made Commander Royal Engineers (CRE) with Northern Command from 1936−1938, followed by being made CRE of the 5th Infantry Division until 1939, and then Chief Engineer, British Troops in Egypt, a position he was holding at the beginning of the Second World War in September 1939.

During the war Tickell served in the Middle East, and in 1940 was appointed Director of Works with Middle East Command. In 1944, still in the Middle East, he was briefly made Engineer-in-Chief with Middle East Command, before being made Director of Works with the 21st Army Group, from 1944−1945. Engineer-in-Chief with the British Liberation Army in 1945, he returned that year to the War Office to be made Engineer-in-Chief there.

His father, Charles Tickell, was a Civil Engineer who worked for the Maharajah of Kashmir (1892–1894). The father of Major General Marston Tickell, Major General Sir Eustace Tickell was invested as a Companion of the Order of the Bath in 1942, and as a Knight Companion of the Order of the British Empire in 1945. After being made President of the Institution of Royal Engineers in 1948, a post he retained until 1951, he retired from the British Army in 1949 but the next year he was made Colonel Commandant of the Royal Engineer Corps until 1958, as well as, in 1953, becoming Honorary Colonel of the Army Emergency Reserve Royal Engineers Resource Unit, until 1959. Tickell died in Surrey on 28 December 1972, shortly after turning 79.

References

Bibliography

External links
Generals of World War II

1893 births
1972 deaths
People educated at Bedford School
Graduates of the Royal Military Academy, Woolwich
British Army personnel of World War I
British Army generals of World War II
Recipients of the Military Cross
Companions of the Order of the Bath
Knights Commander of the Order of the British Empire
Academics of the Royal Military Academy, Woolwich
Military personnel of British India
War Office personnel in World War II